Big Brother Albania 4 was the fourth season of the Albanian series of the worldwide franchise of Big Brother. It launched on Saturday, 25 December 2010, with fifteen Housemates entering the House. The winner received a 10,000,000 Leks (€75,000) prize. Ermela Mezuraj, a 24-year-old social worker from Tirana won the fourth edition of Big Brother Albania, and in doing so she was the first female winner of the show.
Big Brother 4 (Albania) aired on two cable channels 24 hours a day on the Digit-Alb cable network, as well as on two additional channels on DigitAlb Mobile. Daily reviews were shown Monday through Saturday on Top Channel. The eviction show aired on Saturdays at 21:00 CET, while a Sunday edition closed off the week.
The main host is Arbana Osmani, while Eno Popi hosted the Sunday morning edition called "Big Brother Albania Fans' Club", featuring dialogues with eliminated contestants and fans of the show. Blendi Salaj, a young publicist, blogger and radio morning show host took over the role of the panelist. The panelist asked Housemates questions regarding their life in the Big Brother house, helping to provide the public with deeper insights. The Big Brother Forum didn't return this year.

Housemates
Fifteen housemates entered the house on Day 1. On Day 8 six new housemates entered the house. On Day 22, Edison, Jonela, Faton, Petrit And Shkelqim entered the house.

Nominations table

Notes

: From the beginning of the first live eviction show all of the housemates were automatically nominated for eviction. The three housemates who received the fewest votes to save would be evicted. Shortly before this took place, Imelda, having been automatically put up for the public vote, was evicted from the house.
: Before the eviction in week two, the housemates were told that they all had to vote for one of their fellow housemates that they would like to see be evicted from the house. As this was a fake vote and as Algen received the most votes he was automatically nominated two weeks in row.
: Do to the growing gap between male and female housemates in the house, for nominations in week only female housemates (excluding Ermela) were eligible to be nominated.
: Before round ten of nominations began, Big Brother put the four housemates who had yet to be nominated, Ergys, Mariel, Petrit and Shkelqim, up for a vote to save. The three who lost the vote would automatically be nominated for eviction. The voting results were as follows, Mariel received votes from Alma, Mirjeta, and Neda, Sheklqim received votes from Ermela and Jonela, Ergys received a vote from Klodjana, and Petrit received no votes to save.
: In round fourteen the nominations were done in secret with each housemate writing down on a sheet of paper who they wanted to nominate. Ermela received the most nominations with five and was up for eviction. The public then voted for whether they wanted to save or evict Ermela.

References

External links
 Official WebSite
 Big Brother Albania Forum

2010 Albanian television seasons
2011 Albanian television seasons
04

pl:Big Brother (Albania)#4 edycja